Lindsay Hartley (born Lindsay Nicole Korman; April 17, 1978) is an American actress. She first came to attention with three long-running soap opera roles: Theresa Lopez-Fitzgerald on Passions, Cara Castillo on All My Children, and Arianna Hernandez on Days of Our Lives. Since leaving soap operas, Korman has appeared in a number of made for television films on the Lifetime network.

Early life
Born in Palm Springs, California, Korman is of Jewish, Greek, and Italian origin. Korman was a national pre-teen talent winner of the Young Miss America Beauty Pageant. Singing since age eleven, Korman won a role in the Broadway production of Grease at age eighteen. Then she was lead vocalist in the Las Vegas Sands Hotel afternoon show Viva Las Vegas as well as the lead role of Maria in the Civic Light Opera's West Side Story in Austin, Texas. Additionally, Korman has won several national vocal competitions, including The Los Angeles Philharmonic's Award-Vocal/Opera, The National Date Festival, and America's Showcase Starlet.

Career
In 1999, Korman won the role of Theresa Lopez-Fitzgerald on the NBC soap opera Passions, for which she was nominated for the Soap Opera Digest Award for Outstanding Female Newcomer in 2000. She also made guest appearances on The Weakest Link and The Other Half in 2002.

On April 9, 2009, Hartley made a guest appearance on CSI: Crime Scene Investigation. In late July of that year, Soap Opera Digest announced that she would join the cast of Days of Our Lives, another NBC soap opera, in the recast role of Arianna Hernandez. The role placed her opposite former Passions co-stars Galen Gering and Eric Martsolf, who would once again portray her brother and love interest, respectively. Hartley was written off Days of Our Lives in 2010.

On September 18, 2010, it was announced that Hartley had signed on to play the new character of Cara Castillo on All My Children; she first aired on December 7. She was also cast as DC Comics character Mad Harriet during the tenth and final season of Smallville. In January 2013, it was announced that Hartley signed on to play Cara Castillo on the new All My Children being revived by Prospect Park and to begin airing sometime in April 2013.

Hartley has filled in as Sam McCall on ABC's General Hospital for Kelly Monaco on two occasions in August, 2020 and February, 2022.

Personal life
In 2003, Korman began dating her former Passions co-star Justin Hartley (who played Fox Crane). After six months, the two became engaged on November 13, 2003. They married in a small ceremony on May 1, 2004. On July 3, 2004, she gave birth to their daughter Isabella Justice Hartley. They lived in Los Angeles. On May 6, 2012, Lindsay filed for divorce from Justin in the Los Angeles County Superior Court citing "irreconcilable differences", asking for joint physical and legal custody of their daughter.

Filmography

Awards and nominations

References

External links
 
 Lindsay Hartley at NBC
 Lindsay Hartley.net

1978 births
20th-century American actresses
21st-century American actresses
Actresses from Palm Springs, California
American people of Greek descent
American people of Italian descent
American soap opera actresses
American television actresses
Jewish American actresses
Living people
University of Nevada, Las Vegas alumni